Sapri is a town and comune in the province of Salerno in the Campania region of south-western Italy. It is one of the southernmost towns of the region of Cilento and its population is 6,783.

History 
In June–July 1857 the republican revolutionary Carlo Pisacane led the Sapri expedition here. Pisacane and about 300 of his companions were killed in the suppression of the expedition.

Geography 
The town is a port on Tyrrhenian Sea, located in the southern part of Campania, close to the border with Basilicata. The town is 10 km from Maratea, 8 km from Policastro Bussentino and almost 100 km from Salerno.

Twin towns
 Ripatransone, Italy

See also 
 Cilento
 Sapri Calcio
 Cilentan Coast

References

External links

 Comune of Sapri
 Pro Loco Sapri

Cities and towns in Campania
Coastal towns in Campania
Localities of Cilento